were Buddhist temples established in each of the provinces of Japan by Emperor Shōmu during the Nara period (710 – 794).

History
Tōdai-ji, the provincial temple of Yamato Province, served as the head of all kokubun-ji, and Hokke-ji held that duty for the kokubunni-ji.

Modern place names
Modern place names based on this etymology include: 
Kokubunji, Kagawa
Kokubunji, Tokyo
Kokubunji, Tochigi

See also

 735–737 Japanese smallpox epidemic
 Fuchū
 Glossary of Japanese Buddhism
 Ichinomiya

References

Buddhist temples in Japan
Buddhist archaeological sites in Japan
Former provinces of Japan
Emperor Shōmu
Buddhism in the Nara period